Army is a 1996 Indian Hindi action film directed by Raam Shetty. The film stars Sridevi. It released on 28 June 1996. The movie was reported to be inspired by Sholay.

Plot
The story follows Face Flashback Major Arjun Singh (Shah Rukh Khan), a dutiful army officer and Friend of acclaimed Jailer Raghuvir Singh (Kiran Kumar). He is in love with Geeta (Sridevi), and they get married, and become proud parents. Arjun soon gets involved in the bad books of a notorious gangster named Naagraj (Danny Denzongpa). Arjun starts working undercover in Nagraj's gang, but soon enough, Nagraj is informed about Arjun's real identity, and Arjun is brutally killed face off. When Geeta finds out, she decides to avenge Arjun's murder. When Naagraj finds out that Geeta is out for vengeance, he scoffs at her, refusing to believe that a lone defenseless widow can do him any harm. But Naagraj is in for a surprise when he comes face to face with Geeta and a group of young convicted men on the run who are dedicated to bringing him down - even if they die trying.

Cast
Sridevi as Geeta
Shahrukh Khan as Major Arjun Singh (special appearance)
Danny Denzongpa as Naagraj the main antagonist who kills Arjun.
Sudesh Berry as Khan
Mohnish Behl as Kabir 
Ronit Roy as Gavin 
Ravi Kishan as Kartar
Harish Kumar as Kishan
Aashif Sheikh as Rahul
Ashok Saraf as Pascal
Kiran Kumar as Jailer Raghuvir Singh
Tinnu Anand as Pancham
Kanchan as Bobby
Neelam Mehra as Gayatri
Raymon Singh
Vikas Anand as Police Commissioner
Arun Bakshi as Corrupt Police Inspector Bakshi
Dinesh Hingoo as Parsi Baba
Naushaad Abbas as Fake Cop

Soundtrack

Box office 

It is the 18th-highest-grossing film of 1996 worldwide.

India

It opened on Friday, 28 June 1996, across 190 screens, and earned  nett on its opening day. It grossed  nett in its opening weekend, and had a first week of  nett. The flm earned a total of  nett. It is the 19th-highest-grossing film of 1996 in India.

Overseas

It earned $85,000 (29.96 lakh) outside India. Overseas, It is the 18th-highest-grossing film of 1996.

References

External links

1996 films
1990s Hindi-language films
Films scored by Anand–Milind
Indian action films
Indian films about revenge
Hindi-language action films
1996 action films